= Adeoye Adisa =

Nigerian politician

Minister, Commissioner

Personal details
- Born: Oyo State, Nigeria
- Died: 16 November 2015
- Occupation: Politician, Lawmaker, Lawyer

Adeoye Adisa was a Nigerian politician, lawmaker, and lawyer from Oyo State, Nigeria. He died on 16 November 2015. Before his death, Adisa served in various political offices in Nigeria, including Minister and Commissioner.
